Jennifer Capriati was the defending champion, but lost in the final 6–4, 6–2 to Chanda Rubin.

Seeds

Draw

Finals

Top half

Bottom half

References
Main Draw and Qualifying Draw

Challenge Bell
Tournoi de Québec
Can